McPartland Mountain is located in the Livingston Range, Glacier National Park in the U.S. state of Montana. McPartland Mountain is a little more than a mile south of Heavens Peak. The mountain's name is believed to refer to Frank McPartland, of eastern Montana, who worked around nearby Lake McDonald for two seasons, and drowned in a boating accident on the lake in the 1890s.

See also
 List of mountains and mountain ranges of Glacier National Park (U.S.)

References

External links
 McPartland Mountain (centered in photo): Flickr

Livingston Range
Mountains of Flathead County, Montana
Mountains of Glacier National Park (U.S.)
Mountains of Montana